Sabana Llana Sur is one of the 18 barrios in the municipality of San Juan, Puerto Rico.

Demographics
In 2010, Sabana Llana Sur had a total population of 41,346.

Location
Sabana Llana Sur is located east of El Cinco barrio, north of the municipality of Trujillo Alto and west of the municipality of Carolina. It is bordered by the Sabana Llana Norte and Oriente barrios to the north.

Territories
Sabana Llana Sur has the following features.
   Population: ~44,000 - Land: Area:  - Total Area:

See also
 List of communities in Puerto Rico

References

Río Piedras, Puerto Rico
Barrios of San Juan, Puerto Rico